Jach'a Willk'i (Aymara jach'a big, willk'i gap, "big gap", also spelled Jachcha Willkhi) is a mountain in the Bolivian Andes which reaches a height of approximately . It is located in the La Paz Department, Loayza Province, Cairoma Municipality.

References 

Mountains of La Paz Department (Bolivia)